Guy Ritter (born 1966) is an American musician who primarily performed thrash metal and speed metal. Ritter is best known for his vocals in the Christian metal band, Tourniquet.

History
Ritter started his musical career with the band Holy Danger. 
At the time of Holy Danger's beginning in 1985, Ritter was 19. The band disbanded in 1987. In 1989, Ritter had moved to Los Angeles to find musicians to play with. He found Gary Lenaire and Ted Kirkpatrick, and the three founded Tourniquet. The band recorded three albums before Ritter's departure in 1993, after the recording of Pathogenic Ocular Dissonance There was much speculation on why Ritter departed, such as "This was Guy Ritter's last album with the band. His reasons for leaving were he was getting tired of the thrash vocals and medical allegory" or "Apparently Guy Ritter was unhappy with this new heavier direction the band had taken and decided to part ways in the middle of the recording."

In 1996, Ritter and former bandmate Gary Lenaire formed a new band called Echo Hollow. They formed the band with Matt Rosenblum, a drummer Gary knew, and Matthew Fallentine, Ritter's now-brother-in-law. The band later on added Rafik Oganyan in June 2001. The band disbanded in 2004. In 2017, Ritter performed guest vocals on the song "Stop the Bleeding" on Lenaire's solo album, No Time Now. In 2020, it was announced that Ritter would be performing vocals, alongside Luke Easter, who replaced Ritter in Tourniquet, and Erik Mendez (ex-Tourniquet, 2050) playing guitar on the album, with David Husvik (Extol, Azusa) on drums, recording on Lenaire's sophomore solo album. In 2021, the band was announced as FLOOD, consisting of Ritter, Lenaire, Mendez, Husvik, and Anna Sentina.

Personal life
Ritter is married to Christin Ritter, Matthew Fallentine's sister. They have two children. Ritter is an outspoken Christian. Ritter worked on editing systems for Fox Sports. He enjoys exercise, including hiking and cycling.

Bands
Current
FLOOD - Vocals (2020-present)

Former
Holy Danger - Vocals, Rhythm Guitars (1985-1987)
Tourniquet - Vocals (1989-1993)
Echo Hollow - Vocals (1996-2004)

Discography
Tourniquet
 Stop the Bleeding (1990)
 Psycho Surgery (1991) (2001 rerelease titled Psychosurgery)
 Ark of Suffering (1991) - Music Video
 Video Biopsy (1992) - VHS
 Pathogenic Ocular Dissonance (1992)

Echo Hollow
Diet of Worms (1998)
Superficial Intelligence (2004)

Holy Danger
One Way (1986)
Demo (1986)

Other appearances
Gary Lenaire - No Time Now (2017) (Song: "Stop the Bleeding")

References

Notes

External links

Living people
American performers of Christian music
Date of birth missing (living people)
1966 births
Singers from Oregon
Christian metal musicians
Place of birth missing (living people)